Iosefo Masikau Baleiwairiki also known as either Iosefo Masikau or Iosefo Masi (born 9 May 1998) is a Fijian professional rugby union footballer who plays for the Fijian Drua in the Super Rugby. 

He is a former rugby sevens player, winning a gold medal for Fiji at the 2020 Summer Olympics. He won a gold medal at the 2022 Rugby World Cup Sevens in Cape Town.

Career

Rugby Sevens
He was selected to the national team after his impressive performances at the 2020 Fiji Bitter Marist 7s tournament where he also scored a hattrick in one of the matches.

He made his debut appearance at the Olympics representing Fiji at the 2020 Summer Olympics. He was selected in Fijian squad to compete at the 2020 Summer Olympics in the men's rugby sevens tournament.

Rugby League
On 20 September 2021, Masikau signed with the North Queensland Cowboys in the National Rugby League on a train and replacement contract. He trained with the Cowboys' NRL squad and played the Townsville Blackhawks in the Queensland Cup in 2022.

Rugby Union
In 2022, Masikau returned to rugby union, joining the Fijian Drua.

References

External links

1998 births
Living people
Fiji National University alumni
Fijian rugby league players
Fijian rugby sevens players
Fijian rugby union players
Medalists at the 2020 Summer Olympics
Olympic rugby sevens players of Fiji
Olympic gold medalists for Fiji
Olympic medalists in rugby sevens
Rugby union flankers
Rugby union centres
Rugby union wings
Rugby sevens players at the 2020 Summer Olympics
Fijian Drua players
Townsville Blackhawks players